Jenny McIntosh was the first signer of the Cherokee women's petition of May 2, 1817, one of the first collective women's petitions sent to any body in the United States, and arguably the first women's anti-removal petition in U.S. history.  She became a landholder under the Treaty of 1817, and later made other innovations in petitioning, authoring one of the first petitions for Native women's equal rights to the Tennessee legislature in 1822.

McIntosh was the daughter of Ka-ti (Caty) Harlan and her first husband, John Walker.

References

Cherokee Nation people (1794–1907)
American women's rights activists